"Symphony in X Major" was the second and final single released from Xzibit's fourth album named Man vs. Machine. It features Dr. Dre, is produced by Rick Rock and samples a portion of Johann Sebastian Bach's "Brandenburg Concerto No. 3". Dr. Dre mixed the song. 

A music video was shot for the song directed by Joe Hahn of Linkin Park. Dr. Dre does not appear in the video. It reached number 43 in the Australian singles chart.

Composition 
"Symphony in X Major" samples two extracts of Johann Sebastian Bach's "Brandenburg Concerto No. 3" as interpreted by Wendy Carlos on her 1968 Switched-On Bach album. These two samples are taken from the composition's middle section where it transitions into the relative minor key, "useful in reinforcing the menacing tone of the hip-hop track."

The first corresponds to bars 70-71 of the concerto and appears in the introduction and choruses of the song, while the second is taken from bars 68-69, and is used in the verses and the outro, giving the song a contrasting verse-chorus structure.

Charts

Release history

References

2002 singles
2002 songs
Xzibit songs
Dr. Dre songs
Song recordings produced by Dr. Dre
Songs written by Dr. Dre
Songs written by Xzibit
Loud Records singles